Antodon is a monotypic genus of rhinoceros beetles in the tribe Agaocephalini, erected by Brême in 1845 and containing the species Antodon goryi recorded from Brazil and Ecuador.

References

External links
 

Dynastinae
Monotypic Scarabaeidae genera